Preply is a language learning app and e-learning platform. The company is based in US with employees based in 30 countries across Europe, North America, South America, Africa, and Asia. Preply has 400 employees of 58 different nationalities.

As of 2022, Preply connects over 140,000 tutors teaching 50 languages from 203 countries worldwide.

History
The company was founded in 2012 by Ukrainian entrepreneurs Kirill Bigai, Dmytro Voloshyn, and Serge Lukyanov. The website, preply.com, was relaunched in November 2013 with the focus on online language learning.

On August 31, 2013, Preply became a leading Ukrainian educational startup after an initial angel investment of $180,000 from Semyon Dukach, Borya Shakhnovich, Vadim Yasinovsky, Dan Pasko, Torben Majgaard, and Vostok Ventures.

In 2013, the company started expanding into markets of Ukraine, Belarus, Russia, Kazakhstan and Poland.

In 2016, the Preply platform was restructured by adding a ranking algorithm of machine learning for recommendations and classification of tutors.

In 2018, Preply Classroom (formerly Preply space) was launched as the all-in-one language learning ecosystem with the integrated video platform, online chat, screen sharing, and more.

In 2019, Preply opened a new office in Barcelona, Spain, and expanded its services into UK, Germany, and Spanish markets.

As of September 2021, the app has received $50.6 million of investments in a total of 8 funding rounds.

In July 2022, Preply raised additional $50 million of investements.

Product
Preply’s product is based on one-to-one human tutoring. The company uses a machine learning algorithm to increase matching efficiency between learners and tutors on a variety of parameters such as price, availability, country of birth, other languages spoken, learning objectives and more.

Preply developed a proprietary Curriculum product that is complementing human learning by providing placement tests with AI voice recognition, interactive vocabulary exercises, available on all platforms and other features.

Recognition 
In May 2020, Preply won “The Revenue Hack of 2020” at the Ukrainian Startup Awards.

In July 2021, Preply was a finalist for the 2021 Europas award for “Hottest edTech Startup in Europe”.

References

External links
 

E-learning
Language education
Educational technology companies of the United States
Distance education institutions based in the United States
Companies based in Massachusetts
Online marketplaces of the United States